Chiumo (also known as Chumo or Chomo in Tibet) also known as Khyarisatam by Nyishi people and Kawang Gyang by Puroik people in Arunachal Pradesh; is a mountain peak located at  above sea level on the McMahon Line, which runs between the state of Arunachal Pradesh, India and Tibetan Autonomous Region of China.

Location 

The peak is the second-highest in the Kangto Massif. The southern flank of the Chiumo is located in the Kameng River Basin, while the Subansiri River drains the northern flank.

Climbing history 
There are no documented ascents of Chiumo. However three attempts have been made from the south in the last 5 years by Tapi Mra, Taro Hai, Tagit Sorang and Tame Bagang who were part of the team including several tens of Puroik  guides.

Further reading 

 Yadav, M.P., "First ascent of Nyegyi Kansang", The Himalayan Journal, Issue 52, 1996.

References 

Mountains of Tibet
Six-thousanders of the Himalayas
Mountains of Arunachal Pradesh
Highest points of Indian states and union territories